Yele – West New Britain is a tentative language family proposal by Malcolm Ross that unites three languages: Anêm and Ata (Wasi) of western New Britain, and more dubiously Yélî Dnye (Yele) of Rossel Island. These were classified as East Papuan languages by Stephen Wurm, but this does not now seem tenable. While Anêm and Ata do appear to be related, Yele may turn out to be an Austronesian language.

Pronouns
The evidence for the Yele – West New Britain family comes from the pronouns. Each language has two distinct sets of pronouns, and both sets correspond across the three languages. The forms illustrated here are the free pronouns and subject prefixes of Anêm and Ata, and the free and possessive/prepositional pronouns of Yele. Anêm and Ata make a distinction between inclusive and exclusive we. Yele also has dual pronouns which aren't shown. 

{| class=wikitable
|-
! colspan=4| Anêm
|-
| rowspan=2| I || rowspan=2|  || excl. || 
|-
| incl. || 
|-
| thou ||  || you || 
|-
| he ||  || rowspan=2|they || rowspan=2|
|-
| she ||  
|}

{| class=wikitable
|-
! colspan=4| Ata
|-
| rowspan=2| I || rowspan=2|  || excl. || 
|-
| incl. || 
|-
| thou ||  || you || 
|-
| he ||  || rowspan=2|they || rowspan=2|
|-
| she ||  
|}

{| class=wikitable
|-
! colspan=4| Yele
|-
| I ||  || we || 
|-
| thou || ,  || you || 
|-
| s/he ||  || they || 
|}

See also
Papuan languages

References
Structural Phylogenetics and the Reconstruction of Ancient Language History. Michael Dunn, Angela Terrill, Ger Reesink, Robert A. Foley, Stephen C. Levinson. Science magazine, 23 Sept. 2005, vol. 309, p 2072.
Malcolm Ross (2005). "Pronouns as a preliminary diagnostic for grouping Papuan languages." In: Andrew Pawley, Robert Attenborough, Robin Hide and Jack Golson, eds, Papuan pasts: cultural, linguistic and biological histories of Papuan-speaking peoples, 15-66. Canberra: Pacific Linguistics.

East Papuan languages
 
Papuan languages
Proposed language families
Languages of Papua New Guinea